Ravenshaw Radio is the community radio station (CRS) of Ravenshaw University, Cuttack, Odisha, India. It is the first campus community radio station in Odisha, and was launched on 14 April 2011, the Oriya New Year. It was opened by the Vice-Chancellor of Ravenshaw University, Sri Devdas Chhotray.

Programs on Ravenshaw Radio are broadcast through a low-power 50-watt transmitter, and can be heard on 90.4 MHz within an 8 - 10 km radius. The station caters primarily to the university's students.

References
Community Media: Ravenshaw Radio, Cuttack, Odisha | profile by CommunityVoices.in
Ravenshaw Radio goes air
Tune in to Ravenshaw Radio for Mega Singing Cont
University radio to go on air today | Bhubaneswar News - Times of India
Orissa gets its first campus-based Community Radio Station

2011 establishments in Odisha
Campus, college, student and university radio stations
Radio stations established in 2011
Radio stations in Odisha
Ravenshaw University